The 55th Fighter Squadron is part of the 20th Fighter Wing at Shaw Air Force Base, South Carolina. It operates the General Dynamics F-16 Fighting Falcon aircraft conducting air superiority missions.

The squadron is one of the oldest in the United States Air Force, its origins dating to 9 August 1917, being organized at Kelly Field, Texas. It deployed overseas to France as part of the American Expeditionary Forces, as an aero construction squadron at the Third Aviation Instructional Center, Issoudun Aerodrome. The squadron saw combat during World War II, and became part of the United States Air Forces in Europe during the Cold War.

History

World War I
The 55th Fighter Squadron's roots trace back to 9 August 1917. Originally organized as the 55th Aero Squadron at Kelly Field, Texas, by November the 55th Aero Squadron (Construction) was deployed to Third Aviation Instruction Center on Issoudun Aerodrome, France, then to the American Aerial Gunnery School in St. Jean de Monts on 16 May 1918. The squadron was demobilized on 6 March 1919, following World War I. The squadron was reactivated in November 1930, at Mather Field, California, flying Boeing P-12 aircraft, later joined by DH-4 aircraft in 1931. The squadron moved several times in the next decade, flying the P-26, Curtiss P-36 Hawk, and finally the Curtiss P-40 Warhawk at Hamilton Field.

World War II
At the beginning of World War II, the 55th sent its personnel to units fighting overseas and continued to train aviators for squadrons in Europe and the Pacific. In May 1942, it was redesignated a fighter squadron and switched to the Bell P-39 Airacobra, operating from several locations in the United States before acquiring Lockheed P-38 Lightnings.

The 55th was in the skies over Europe by August 1943, operating from RAF Wittering, England. The squadron flew 175 combat missions with the Lightning before acquiring the North American P-51 Mustang in 1944. With the rest of the 20th Fighter Group, the 55th flew daily strafing, long-range-patrol and bomber-escort missions. In June, they provided air cover during the massive allied invasion of Normandy.

As the war progressed, the 55th performed escort and fighter-bomber missions supporting the Allied advance through Central Europe and the Rhineland. In December 1944, the unit escorted bombers to their targets in the Battle of the Bulge. The squadron's 175th and last combat mission in the P-51 was flown in April 1945, the day after American and Soviet forces met at the Elbe River. The 55th was demobilized on 18 October 1945, after the war's end.

Cold War

The 55th was reactivated on 29 July 1946, at Biggs Field, Texas, flying airpower demonstrations and training operations in the P-51. It entered the jet age in February 1948, switching to the Republic F-84G Thunderjet. In January 1950, it was redesignated the 55th Fighter-Bomber Squadron. The squadron returned to England at RAF Wethersfield in June 1952. The squadron switched to the North American F-100 Super Sabre in 1957 and in 1958 was redesignated the 55th Tactical Fighter Squadron.

The 55th moved with the 20th Tactical Fighter Wing to RAF Upper Heyford in June 1970. The next April, the 55th received its first F-111E Aardvark, becoming fully operational in November. Throughout the 1970s and 1980s, the 55th participated in countless North Atlantic Treaty Organization and U.S. exercises and operations, helping contain Soviet threats to Europe.

In January 1991, elements of the 55th deployed to Turkey during Operation Desert Storm. They flew more than 144 sorties, amassing 415 combat hours without a loss. These missions neutralized key facilities throughout northern Iraq and helped to liberate Kuwait and stabilize the region. The squadron was inactivated in December 1993.

Modern era

It reactivated on 1 January 1994 at its present home, Shaw Air Force Base, flying the Fairchild Republic A-10 Thunderbolt II. In July 1996, the squadron transferred its aircraft to Pope Air Force Base, North Carolina, and stood down.

In July 1997, the 55th made history when it stood up as a combat-ready General Dynamics F-16 Fighting Falcon squadron in only 60 days. It has since made numerous deployments to Southwest Asia, operating against threats in Iraq.

The squadron has earned awards and recognition, including the David C. Schilling Award in 1999 and 2000, as well as the Air Force Association Citation of Honor.

In the summer of 2000, the 55th deployed to Southwest Asia for Operation Northern Watch. It followed that deployment with Operation Southern Watch in the fall of 2001, and in the winter of 2002, deployed again in support of Operation Northern Watch. In late 2008, the 55th deployed to support Operation Iraqi Freedom.

Lineage
 Organized as the 55th Aero Squadron on 9 August 1917
 Redesignated 55th Aero Squadron (Construction) on 25 August 1917
 Redesignated 467th Aero Squadron (Construction) on 1 February 1918
 Demobilized on 16 March 1919
 Reconstituted and redesignated 55th Pursuit Squadron on 24 March 1923
 Activated on 15 November 1930
 Redesignated 55th Pursuit Squadron (Fighter) on 6 December 1939
 Redesignated 55th Pursuit Squadron (Interceptor) on 12 March 1941
 Redesignated 55th Fighter Squadron on 15 May 1942
 Redesignated 55th Fighter Squadron (Twin Engine) on 30 December 1942
 Redesignated 55th Fighter Squadron, Two Engine on 20 August 1943
 Redesignated 55th Fighter Squadron, Single Engine on 5 September 1944
 Inactivated on 18 October 1945
 Activated on 29 July 1946
 Redesignated 55th Fighter Squadron, Jet on 15 June 1948
 Redesignated 55th Fighter-Bomber Squadron on 20 January 1950
 Redesignated 55th Tactical Fighter Squadron on 8 July 1958
 Redesignated 55th Fighter Squadron on 1 October 1991
 Inactivated on 30 December 1993
 Activated on 1 January 1994

Assignments
 Signal Corps, 28 August–November 1917
 Third Aviation Instruction Center, November 1917
 Aerial Gunnery School, May 1918
 2d Air Depot, November 1918 – February 1919
 Unknown, February–16 March 1919
 2d Bombardment Wing, 15 November 1930 (attached to 20th Pursuit Group)
 8th Pursuit Group, 1 April 1931 (attached to 20th Pursuit Group)
 20th Pursuit Group (later 20th Fighter Group), 15 June 1932 – 18 October 1945
 20th Fighter Group (later 20th Fighter-Bomber Group), 29 July 1946 (attached to 20th Fighter-Bomber Wing after 15 Nov 1952)
 20th Fighter-Bomber Wing (later 20th Tactical Fighter Wing), 8 February 1955 (attached to 39th Tactical Group, 31 August–23 October 1990
 20th Operations Group, 31 March 1992 – 30 December 1993
 20th Operations Group, 1 January 1994 – present

Stations

 Kelly Field, Texas, 9 August 1917
 Hazelhurst Field, New York, 21 September–13 October 1917
 Issoudun Aerodrome, France, 4 November 1917
 Saint-Jean-de-Monts Aerodrome, France, 16 May 1918
 Latrecey air depot, France, 6 November 1918 – c. 8 February 1919
 Garden City, New York, c. 4–16 March 1919
 Mather Field, California, 15 November 1930
 Barksdale Field, Louisiana, 31 October 1932
 Moffett Field, California, 19 November 1939
 Hamilton Field, California, 9 September 1940
 Army Air Base Wilmington, North Carolina, c. 22 February 1942
 Morris Field, North Carolina, 23 April 1942
 Drew Field, Florida, 7 August 1942
 Paine Field, Washington, 30 September 1942

 March Field, California, c. 1 January–11 August 1943
 RAF Wittering, England, c. 27 August 1943
 RAF Kings Cliffe, England, April 1944 – 11 October 1945
 Camp Kilmer, New Jersey, 16–18 October 1945
 Biggs Field, Texas, 29 July 1946
 Shaw Field (later Shaw Air Force Base), South Carolina, c. 25 October 1946
 Langley Air Force Base, Virginia, 19 November 1951 – 22 May 1952
 RAF Wethersfield, England, 1 June 1952
 RAF Sculthorpe, England, 9 August 1955
 RAF Wethersfield, England, 27 April 1956
 RAF Upper Heyford, England, England, c. 1 June 1970 – 30 December 1993 (deployed to Incirlik Air Base, Turkey 31 August – 23 October 1990)
 Shaw Air Force Base, South Carolina, 1 January 1994 – present

Aircraft

 Boeing P-12 (1930–1935)
 Dayton-Wright DH-4 (1931)
 Boeing P-26 Peashooter (1934–1938)
 Curtiss P-36 Hawk (1938–1940)
 Curtiss P-40 Warhawk (1940–1942)
 Bell P-39 Airacobra (1942–1943)
 Lockheed P-38 Lightning (1943–1944)
 North American P-51 Mustang (1944–1945, 1946–1948)
 Republic F-84 Thunderjet (1948–1957)
 North American F-100 Super Sabre (1957–1971)
 General Dynamics F-111 Aardvark (1971–1993)
 Fairchild Republic A-10 Thunderbolt II (1994–1997)
 General Dynamics F-16 Fighting Falcon (1997 – present)

See also

 List of American Aero Squadrons

References

Notes
 Explanatory notes

 Citations

Bibliography

External links
55th Fighter Squadron Fact Sheet

055
Military units and formations in South Carolina
055